Kapolei High School, located in Kapolei community, in the City and County of Honolulu, Hawaii, United States, on the Island of Oahu, is a public high school. It is a part of the Hawaii Department of Education.

On July 24, 2000, Kapolei opened with first-year students. In the 2006–2007 school year, Kapolei High School had over 2,300 students in grades 9–12. Its mascot is the Hurricanes, and the school colors are teal, black and silver. The school's football field has been used as the practice field for the Pro Bowl.

Due to the school's MCJROTC achievements, the school is recognized as a Naval Honor School for JROTC.

References

External links
 Kapolei High School homepage

Public high schools in Honolulu County, Hawaii
Educational institutions established in 2000
2000 establishments in Hawaii